Darüşşafaka Ayhan Şahenk Sports Hall (Turkish: Darüşşafaka Ayhan Şahenk Spor Salonu) is a multi-purpose indoor arena that is located in Istanbul, Turkey. The arena is mostly used to host basketball games, but can also be used to host artistic and cultural events. It has a seating capacity for 3,500 spectators.

History
Darüşşafaka Ayhan Şahenk Sports Hall opened in 1995, and is the home arena of the Turkish Super League team Darüşşafaka. It was also for a while, the home arena of the Turkish Super League club Anadolu Efes. Galatasaray men's basketball and Galatasaray women's basketball teams have also used the arena to host home games.

References

External links
Darüşşafaka Ayhan Şahenk Sports Hall
Image 1 of Darüşşafaka Ayhan Şahenk Sports Hall's Interior
Image 2 of Darüşşafaka Ayhan Şahenk Sports Hall's Interior

Basketball venues in Turkey
Indoor arenas in Turkey
Sports venues in Istanbul
Sports venues completed in 1995
Galatasaray S.K. facilities
1995 establishments in Turkey
Turkish Basketball League venues